Truxillic acids are any of several crystalline stereoisomeric cyclic dicarboxylic acids with the formula (C6H5C2H2(CO2H)2. They are colorless solids.  These compounds are obtained by the [2 + 2] photocycloadditions of cinnamic acid where the two trans alkenes react head-to-tail. The isolated stereoisomers are called truxillic acids.  The preparation of truxillic acids provided an early example of organic photochemistry.

Occurrence and reactions
These compounds are found in a variety of plants, for example in coca. Incarvillateine, an alkaloid from the plant Incarvillea sinensis, is a derivative of α-truxillic acid.

Upon heating, truxillic acids undergo cracking to give cinnamic acid.

Isomers 
Truxillic acid can exist in five stereoisomers.

Below are the 5 naturally occurring stereoisomers of truxillic acid, namely alpha, gamma, epsilon, peri, and epi. These are shown both in a 2D skeletal diagram with stereocenters indicated and a 3D rendering of the structural geometry of the isomers themselves. Because of the 4 stereocenters, there are 16 possible isomers of truxillic acid, but only these 5 are well known in nature and have been discovered and named thusly but chemists historically.

See also
 Truxinic acids are isomers of the truxillic acids with phenyl groups on adjacent methyne centers.

References 

Dicarboxylic acids
Phenyl compounds
Cyclobutanes